Médiaszolgáltatás-támogató és Vagyonkezelő Alap (MTVA)
is a Hungarian fund company owned and financed by the Hungarian state, through the State Office of Media and Communications (NMHH). MTVA was established on 1 January 2011, and from July 2015 the company's main task has been to finance and operate Duna Média, Hungary's state public company. It is an active member of the European Broadcasting Union.

A 2019 report by the European Federation of Journalists stated that news coverage of Hungarian public broadcaster is not balanced, opposition politicians' viewpoints are nearly absent from the reports, and there is a lack of transparency over the funding and work of MTVA. The report concluded that the "public service media have been deformed into state media."

History

MTVA brought together four public media companies in Hungary: Magyar Rádió (MR), Magyar Televízió (MT), Duna Televízió (Duna TV) and Magyar Távirati Iroda (MTI). At the same time, MTI was given the exclusive right to produce news content for the public broadcasters. According to Hungarian politicians, the establishment of MTVA should help clean up the country's "dysfunctional public broadcasting sector". However, the media reform received criticism from foreign politicians and media experts, who believed the reform limited the independence of broadcasters and gave the government greater control over the country's public broadcasters.

The four broadcasters continued as four divisions under MTVA, but on 1 July 2015 were merged into one joint broadcasting company: Duna Media. This nonprofit organization is the legal successor to each of the four formerly separate entities managed by the MTVA. The Duna TV channel become the main generalist channel, replacing the first Magyar Televízió channel M1, the oldest in Hungary, which changed its format/genre and assumed continuous broadcast of news related programming.
 
Among other things, MTVA is responsible for distributing funds and resources to the various departments in Duna Media. Most people who work for Duna Media are also employed through MTVA. According to the Hungarian National Assembly, MTVA wants to have a relationship with its British counterpart, BBC.

Services
 
Its activities include radio, television, news agencies and online services as listed below:

Radio
MR operated 7 radio stations:
Kossuth Rádió: News and entertainment
: Pop music and youth programming
: Classical music
: Folk, operetta and pop-folk
: broadcasts programs aimed at ethnic minorities in Hungary
: Parliamentary broadcasts and political events
: broadcasts news and Hungarian programs to Hungarians abroad

Television
Duna: Duna Media's main generalist channel for television.
Duna World: international channel which caters to Hungarians abroad
M1: broadcasts news, debates and current affairs programming.
M2: children channel
: channel for young people
M3: broadcasts movies and historical programs, taken from the archives of Magyar Televízió and Duna TV. As a TV channel, it closed down on 30 April 2019 and launched as an online service the following day.
: Sports channel established in July 2015
: Sports channel established in September 2020 which caters to Hungarians abroad
: culture and educational programming

News agency
 Magyar Távirati Iroda – Hungarian state information and press agency established in 1881.

Internet

 Hirado.hu – A popular news portal related to the news program of the same name
 Mediaklikk.hu – Official MTVA website
 M4sport.hu – Official site of M4 Sport
 Petofilive.hu – Official site of Petőfi Rádió
 Teletext.hu – Teletext service

Controversies 
In 2011, MTVA's news editor Dániel Papp manipulated a news segment about politician Daniel Cohn-Bendit to make it look like he fled the scene without an answer after being questioned on accusations of child abuse. Subsequently uncut footage showed that Cohn-Bendit actually replied to the reporter's questions and denied the accusations. Papp was later promoted. In the same year, Zoltán Lomnici, the former president of the Supreme Court was blurred out from a report about a press conference he was co-hosting. The censoring of Lomnici was suggested to be politically motivated.

In 2019 a leaked audio recording made during the run-up to European Parliament elections showed a senior MTVA editor, Balazs Bende informing reporters that the institution does not favor the opposition's list and the reporters should work accordingly. Bende instructed the reporters to produce content using the "appropriate" narrative and methodology, especially on topics like Brussels and migrants.

See also
 Duna Média
 Television in Hungary

References

External links

 
 Mi sohasem vetemednénk arra, hogy elhallgattassuk azokat akik nem értenek egyet velünk

 
Hungarian companies established in 2011
Government-owned companies of Hungary
Publicly funded broadcasters
State media
Television in Hungary
Radio in Hungary
Television channel articles with incorrect naming style
Mass media in Budapest
Organisations based in Budapest
European Broadcasting Union members